Patricio "Pato" Germán Margetic (born May 17, 1960, in Avellaneda, Argentina) is a former Argentine footballer.  He began his career in Argentina before playing five seasons in the North American Soccer League, as well as the Major Indoor Soccer League.

Playing career 

Margetic's professional career began in 1978 for Club Atletico San Telmo from the Isla Maciel district of Avellaneda.

He came to the United States to play for the Detroit Express in 1979 and then moved on to the Chicago Sting in 1981, where he went on to win NASL Soccer Bowls in 1981 and 1984. He was a first team all star in 1983, a second team selection in 1982 and 1984, and an honorable mention in 1981. While playing for the Sting he earned the nickname "Magic Man". Margetic played in 130 NASL games, scoring 42 goals and 59 assists for 143 points, which ranks him 34th all-time in the league. Margetic scored the last goal in the history of the NASL in the 82nd minute of game two of the 1984 Soccer Bowl series. After the end of the NASL, Margetic played six seasons in the Major Indoor Soccer League for the Chicago Sting, Kansas City Comets, Cleveland Crunch and Tacoma Stars, and nine seasons in the National Professional Soccer League for the Chicago Power and Detroit Rockers. He also appeared briefly for Borussia Dortmund in 1988–89.

Coaching
He has spent the past several years running Pato's Magic Soccer, a Michigan non-profit promoting youth soccer affiliated with the Michigan Youth Soccer League and the Michigan State Premier Soccer Program. He also does recruiting for the Chicago Fire. He now coaches and heads the Magic Soccer Club in Michigan. Pato and Magic Soccer Club partner with camps and classes running through the Rochester Avon Recreation Authority (RARA) in Rochester, MI. RARA is the recreation department for Rochester and Rochester Hills, Michigan.

References

External links 
 NASL/MISL stats

1960 births
Living people
American Indoor Soccer Association players
Argentine expatriate footballers
Argentine footballers
Argentine people of Croatian descent
Borussia Dortmund players
Bundesliga players
Chicago Power (AISA) players
Chicago Power (NPSL) players
Chicago Sting (MISL) players
Chicago Sting (NASL) players
Cleveland Crunch (original MISL) players
Detroit Express players
Detroit Rockers players
Expatriate footballers in Germany
Argentine expatriate sportspeople in Germany
Expatriate soccer players in the United States
Argentine expatriate sportspeople in the United States
Association football forwards
Kansas City Comets (original MISL) players
Major Indoor Soccer League (1978–1992) players
North American Soccer League (1968–1984) indoor players
National Professional Soccer League (1984–2001) players
North American Soccer League (1968–1984) players
Sportspeople from Avellaneda
Tacoma Stars players